Mesut Özgür (born 23 January 1990) is a Turkish footballer. As of 2009 he played for the club Mudanyaspor and was one of the young players of Bursaspor whom coach Güvenç Kurtar trusted and gave the opportunity to play in the 2008–2009 season.

Özgür made his senior debut in a Turkish Cup match against Ankaragücü on 11 December 2008.

References

1990 births
Living people
Turkish footballers
Bursaspor footballers
Süper Lig players
Association football defenders